Wang Yue (born 9 April 1991) is a Chinese biathlete. She competed in the 2014/15 World Cup season, and represented China at the Biathlon World Championships 2015 in Kontiolahti.

References

External links 
 

1991 births
Living people
Chinese female biathletes